Hannan Abu-Hussein (in Arabic: حنان أبو حسين;  born 1972 in Umm-El-Fahem) is a Palestinian artist and educator living and working in Jerusalem.

Life and work 
Hannan Abu-Hussein was born in 1972 in the city of Umm al-Fahm as the youngest daughter amongst four older brothers. She studied art at the Max Stern Yezreel Valley College (1992-1995). After graduating she continued her studies earning a B.F.A. from the art department at the Bezalel Academy of Arts and Design, Jerusalem (1995-1999) followed by a scholarship of an additional year of art research. She carried on studying, earning a diploma in Organizational Management of Art Institutes from Tel Aviv University (2000-2001); a teacher's certificate in art education from the Hebrew University (2002); post graduate studies at the ceramics department at Bezalel Academy of Arts and Design, Jerusalem (2001-2003); a diploma in group instruction from the Tel Aviv University (2012-2013); studied Israeli Art at the Tel Aviv-Yafo Academy (2015); and an M.A in Art History from the Hebrew University (graduating 2016).

Abu-Hussein's work is Inspired by her own life experience as a woman living in a segregated society. Abu-Hussein uses art to examine themes dealing with the status of women, and the way they function within the patriarchal society. Her work has examined closely issues such as ‘exclusion of women’, ‘violence’, ‘family honor’ in the Arab society, and the idea and function of the meaning of “Home”. Concepts that are presented in the form of installations whose form and size vary by the designated exhibition space. The Ministry of Education Young Artist Prize committee describe her as “an aware and uncompromising artist who uses charged imagery that touches specific characteristics that deal with women's position in the Arab culture.” For many years she has been examining local floor tiles (balatot) and concrete as materials that formally represent the issues at hand. “Concrete is a central characteristic that is essential to Abu-Hussein’s work and which connects it. It is a hard substance, that connects to ideas like construction, stability, inflexibility, borders, walls, homes. The concrete is combined with feminine objects and imagery thus creating conflicts within the material and concepts. Monuments that are painful, prickly, vulnerable and fragile, created from a struggle for independence, equality and for freedom”, writes Shirley Meshulam who curated a show of Abu-Hussein's work titled “Deep Breath” at the Grand Art Gallery in Haifa. “The materials that she uses are simple, direct and strong. The objects that occupy her installations create a fascinating hallucinatory scene, that encourage the viewer to be in their proximity but simultaneously repulse him creating a sense of terror”, write the judges of the Creativity Encouragement Award in the 2010 catalog. Since 2002 Abu-Hussein has started experimenting with video, which has slowly become more crucial to her work. In Aida Nasrallah's words: “Video as a tool enables her to check cultural boundaries and surface issues that touch gender and multiple identities, scrutinizing different aspects of oppression – cultural, social, gender-oriented, status and political.”

Her studio is located in The New Gallery Artist Studios at Teddy Stadium in Jerusalem. In addition to her work as an artist Abu-Hussein works as an educator in the youth department at the Israel Museum and at a public boys' school in Isawiya neighborhood of Jerusalem.

Honors 
 2014: Ministry of Culture and Sport prize for plastic art
 2012: Artist Book Award, Mifal Hapais Scholarship
 2011: Master Teacher Award, Ministry of Education
 2010: Creativity Encouragement Award, Ministry of Education
 2004: Young Artist Prize, Ministry of Education
 2002: Heinrich Boell Fund
 2000-2002: American Israeli Fund for Outstanding Artist
 1998-2000: American Israeli Fund for Outstanding Artist

Solo exhibitions 
 2014: “Momentary Freedom”, Barbur Gallery, Jerusalem.
 2014: “Deep Breath”, Grand Art Gallery, Haifa.
 2009: “Broken”, Comme il Faut, Tel Aviv.
 2008: “Under the Tile”, Office Gallery, Tel Aviv.
 2008: “Samt el frashat”, Bet Ahoti Gallery, Tel Aviv.
 2007: “Sharp Cover”, David Yellin Gallery, Jerusalem.
 2006: “Daweer”, Levontine Gallery, Tel Aviv.
 2003: “Stretched”, Antia Gallery, Jerusalem.

Selected group exhibitions 
 2017: “No Place Like Home”, Israel Museum, Jerusalem.
 2016: “Allegory”, The Artists’ House, Tel Aviv.
 2015: “Winners”, Tel Aviv Museum, Tel Aviv.
 2014: “Triangle of Chicago”, Haifa Museum, Haifa.
 2013: “Daughter of Zion, and the Exclusion of Women in Jerusalem”, The Artists’ House, Jerusalem.
 2012: “Re: Visiting Rockefeller”, Rockefeller Museum, Jerusalem.
 2012: “Spring 2012”, Mecca Gallery, NJ.
 2011: “Encouragement Award Created”, Ramat Gan Museum, Ramat Gan.
 2010: “Resonance Boxes”, Rubin Museum, Tel Aviv.
 2010: “Childhood Stories”, Whitebox, Munich.
 2010: “Women’s Rights & Excision”, Moissy Cramayel Gallery, Paris.
 2009: “Jerusalem, Surface, Fractures”, The Artists’ House, Jerusalem.
 2009: “Pieces”, Comme il-Faut Gallery, Tel Aviv.
 2009: “Art Emergency”, Artneuland, Berlin.
 2009: “Culture of Torture, Torture in Culture”, Artneuland, Berlin.
 2008: “Fil(s) De Me`more”, Zukunftslabor Galerie, Stuttgart, Germany.
 2008: “Raum für Video / Space for Video”, Figge Von Rosen Galerie, Berlin.
 2008: “Momire de l` Avenir", the Cite` International des Art, Paris.
 2008: “Language & Gender”, Artneuland, Berlin.
 2007: “Out Let”, Comme il faut Gallery, Tel Aviv.
 2007: “Desert Generation”, Jerusalem, Tel Aviv, Amsterdam.
 2006: “Artneuland”, Berlin.
 2006: “From the ashes come to me”, Khalil El Skakni Gallery, Ramallah.
 2006: “New Territories”, Bruges, Belgium.
 2006: “Erasing”, Bloomfield Science Museum, Jerusalem.
 2006: “Offering Reconciliation”, Ramat Gan Museum, Ramat Gan.
 2005: “Lieu Commun”, Main D'Oeuvres Gallery, Paris
 2005: “Show your wound”, Kunsthaus Dresden, Germany.
 2005: “Young Artists Reward”, Tel Aviv Museum, Tel Aviv.
 2005: “Beauty and the Book”, Israel Museum, Jerusalem.
 2005: “Walking on Eggs”, Ashdod Museum, Ashdod.
 2003: “Triannual”, Museum of Modern Art, Haifa.

References

External links 

Interview with Hannan Abu-Hussein on the Van Leer website in Arabic/Hebrew.
"Hannan Abu-Hussein: Body Fragments", on Haifa Museum of Art Website.
"The unmarked body".
"Hannan's Monologue", in Haaretz online, Feb 26, 2003.
"How women are using art and militancy to fight gender-based violence in Israel", I24 News website.

1972 births
Living people
Palestinian artists